Tempering is a cooking technique used in India, Bangladesh, Nepal, Pakistan and Sri Lanka, in which whole spices (and sometimes also other ingredients such as dried chillies, minced ginger root or sugar) are roasted briefly in oil or ghee to liberate essential oils from cells and thus enhance their flavours, before being poured, together with the oil, into a dish. Tempering is also practiced by dry-roasting whole spices in a pan before grinding the spices. Tempering is typically done at the beginning of cooking, before adding the other ingredients for a curry or similar dish, or it may be added to a dish at the end of cooking, just before serving (as with a dal, sambar or stew).

Ingredients used

Ingredients typically used in tempering include cumin seeds, black mustard seeds, fennel seeds, kalonji, fresh green chilis, dried red chilis, fenugreek seeds, asafoetida, cassia, cloves, urad dal, curry leaves, chopped onion, garlic, or tejpat leaves. When using multiple ingredients in tempering, they are often added in succession, with those requiring longer cooking added earlier, and those requiring less cooking added later. In Oriya cuisine and Bengali cuisine, a mixture of whole spices called panch phutana or panch phoron is used for this purpose.

Terminology 

Some Indo-Aryan and Dravidian languages use a form inherited (through an early borrowing, in the case of Kannada) from the Sanskrit root vyághāra- "sprinkling over":
 in Gujarati 
 in Hindi  
 in Oriya
 in Bengali
 in Kannada

Some Indo-Aryan languages use a form inherited from the Sanskrit root 
sphōṭana- "crackling, cracking":

 in Bhojpuri
 in Bengali
 in Marathi
phōṇṇa in Konkani

Some Indo-Aryan languages use a form inherited from the Sanskrit root traṭatkāra- "crackles, splits, fizzes":

 in Hindi
 in Garhwali
 in Punjabi

Another root beginning with an aspirated affricate is found in yet other Indo-Aryan languages:
 in Oriya
 in Hindi
chunkay or chaunkay in Caribbean Hindustani

Dravidian languages also have various other forms for the same usage:
 in Tamil
 in Telugu
 in Telugu

See also

 Sofrito
 Mirepoix (cuisine)
 Holy trinity (cooking)
 List of cooking techniques
 Sautéing

References

Uttar Pradeshi cuisine
Bengali cuisine
Herb and spice mixtures
Cooking techniques
Bangladeshi cuisine
Indian cuisine
Pakistani cuisine